Agrochola is a genus of moths of the family Noctuidae. The genus was erected by Jacob Hübner in 1821.

Species

 Agrochola agnorista Boursin, 1955
 Agrochola albimacula Kononenko, 1978
 Agrochola albirena Boursin, 1956
 Agrochola antiqua (Hacker, 1993)
 Agrochola approximata (Hampson, 1906)
 Agrochola attila Hreblay & Ronkay, 1999
 Agrochola azerica Ronkay & Gyulai, 1997
 Agrochola blidaensis (Stertz, 1915)
 Agrochola circellaris (Hufnagel, 1766) – the brick
 Agrochola deleta (Staudinger, 1881)
 Agrochola disrupta Wiltshire, 1952
 Agrochola dubatolovi Varga & Ronkay, 1991
 Agrochola egorovi (Bang-Haas, 1934)
 Agrochola evelina (Butler, 1879)
 Agrochola fibigeri Hacker & Moberg, 1989
 Agrochola flavirena (Moore, 1881)
 Agrochola gorza Hreblay & Ronkay, 1999
 Agrochola gratiosa (Staudinger, 1881)
 Agrochola haematidea (Duponchel, 1827) – southern chestnut
 Agrochola helvola (Linnaeus, 1758)
 Agrochola humilis (Denis & Schiffermüller, 1775)
 Agrochola hypotaenia (Bytinski-Salz, 1936)
 Agrochola imitana Ronkay, 1984
 Agrochola insularis (Walker, 1875)
 Agrochola janhillmanni (Hacker & Moberg, 1989)
 Agrochola karma Hreblay, Peregovits & Ronkay, 1999
 Agrochola kindermanni (Fischer von Röslerstamm, [1841])
 Agrochola kosagezai Hreblay, Peregovits & Ronkay, 1999
 Agrochola kunandrasi Hreblay & Ronkay, 1999
 Agrochola lactiflora (Draudt, 1934)
 Agrochola laevis (Hübner, [1803])
 Agrochola leptographa Hacker & Ronkay, 1990
 Agrochola litura (Linnaeus, 1761)
 Agrochola lota (Clerck, 1759) – red-line Quaker
 Agrochola luteogrisea (Warren, 1911)
 Agrochola lychnidis (Denis & Schiffermüller, 1775) – beaded chestnut
 Agrochola macilenta (Hübner, [1809]) – yellow-line Quaker
 Agrochola mansueta (Herrich-Schäffer, [1850])
 Agrochola meridionalis (Staudinger, 1871)
 Agrochola minorata Hreblay & Ronkay, 1999
 Agrochola naumanni Hacker & Ronkay, 1990
 Agrochola nekrasovi Hacker & Ronkay, 1992
 Agrochola nigriclava Boursin, 1957
 Agrochola nitida (Denis & Schiffermüller, 1775)
 Agrochola occulta Hacker, [1997]
 Agrochola orejoni Agenjo, 1951
 Agrochola orientalis Fibiger, 1997
 Agrochola oropotamica (Wiltshire, 1941)
 Agrochola osthelderi Boursin, 1951
 Agrochola pallidilinea Hreblay, Peregovits & Ronkay, 1999
 Agrochola pamiricola Hacker & Ronkay, 1992
 Agrochola phaeosoma (Hampson, 1906)
 Agrochola pistacinoides (d'Aubuisson, 1867)
 Agrochola plumbea (Wiltshire, 1941)
 Agrochola plumbitincta Hreblay, Peregovits & Ronkay, 1999
 Agrochola prolai Berio, 1976
 Agrochola pulchella (Smith, 1900)
 Agrochola pulvis (Guenée, 1852)
 Agrochola punctilinea Hreblay & Ronkay, 1999
 Agrochola purpurea (Grote, 1874)
 Agrochola rufescentior (Rothschild, 1914)
 Agrochola rupicapra (Staudinger, 1878)
 Agrochola sairtana Derra, 1990
 Agrochola sakabei Sugi, 1980
 Agrochola scabra (Staudinger, 1891)
 Agrochola schreieri (Hacker & Weigert, 1984)
 Agrochola semirena (Draudt, 1950)
 Agrochola siamica Hreblay & Ronkay, 1999
 Agrochola spectabilis Hacker & Ronkay, 1990
 Agrochola statira Boursin, 1960
 Agrochola staudingeri Ronkay, 1984
 Agrochola telortoides Hreblay & Ronkay, 1999
 Agrochola thurneri Boursin, 1953
 Agrochola trapezoides (Staudinger, 1882)
 Agrochola tripolensis (Hampson, 1914)
 Agrochola turcomanica Ronkay, Varga & Hreblay, 1998
 Agrochola turneri Boursin, 1953
 Agrochola vulpecula (Lederer, 1853)
 Agrochola wolfsclaegeri Boursin, 1953
 Agrochola zita Hreblay & Ronkay, 1999

The following species are sometimes placed in the genus Sunira, while other authors consider Sunira to be a subgenus of Agrochola:
 Agrochola bicolorago (Guenée, 1852)
 Agrochola decipiens (Grote, 1881)
 Agrochola verberata (Smith, 1904)

References

 
Noctuoidea genera